The Super Scope, known as the Nintendo Scope in Europe and Australia, is a first party light gun peripheral for the Super Nintendo Entertainment System. The successor to the NES Zapper, the Super Scope was released in North America and the PAL region in 1992, followed by a limited release in Japan in 1993 due to a lack of consumer demand. The peripheral consists of two devices: the wireless light gun itself, called the "Transmitter", and a "Receiver" that connects to the second controller port of the Super NES console. The Transmitter has two action buttons, a pause button, a power switch and is powered by six AA batteries.

Design

Located about midway on top of the barrel are two buttons, the purple "Fire" button (colored orange in Japanese and European models) and the gray "Pause" button, and a switch used to turn the Super Scope off or select regular or turbo fire. In the middle on either side are two clips for attaching the sight. On the far end of the gun, on the bottom, is a six-inch (15-cm) grip with another button labeled "Cursor".

The sight mount is shaped like a wide, very shallow "U", about five inches long. The end that faces toward the shoulder mount end of the Super Scope has a round open cylinder holder, where the eyepiece goes. The other end has a short, narrow tube, which forms the sight when one looks through the eyepiece that is in-line across from it. The end of the eyepiece is very simple: it is a cylinder with the diameter of a quarter, with a removable rubber piece through which the shooter looks. The Receiver is a small box, with a standard Super NES controller cord attached. On the front is an oval-shaped black area, receding back from the two sides to an infra-red transmitter about the size of a dime.

All of the Super Scope games made by Nintendo have a soft-reset to the game's main title. This is accomplished by pausing the game, then, while holding CURSOR, the FIRE button must be pressed twice.

Hit detection

The Super Scope makes use of the scanning process used in cathode ray tube monitors, as CRTs were the only widely-used TV monitors until the early 2000s. In short, the screen is drawn by a scanning electron beam that travels horizontally across each line of the screen from top to bottom. A fast photodiode will see any particular area of the screen illuminated only briefly as that point is scanned, while the human eye will see a consistent image due to persistence of vision.

The Super Scope takes advantage of this in a fairly simple manner: it simply outputs a  signal when it sees the television raster scan and a  signal when it does not. At the end of the frame, the game software can retrieve this stored position to determine where on the screen the gun was aimed. Most licensed Super Scope games include a calibration mode to account for both electrical delays and maladjustment of the gunsight.

The Super Scope ignores red light, as do many guns of this type because red phosphors have a much slower rate of decay than green or blue phosphors. Since the Super Scope depends on the short persistence and scan pattern of CRT pixels, it will not function with modern displays (such as plasma screens or LCDs) that continuously light each pixel.

Compatible games
Per GamePro.

 Battle Clash
 Bazooka Blitzkrieg
 The Hunt for Red October (used for bonus games)
 Lamborghini American Challenge (features a Super Scope-exclusive mode)
 Lemmings 2: The Tribes (secret easter egg allowing the super scope to destroy lemmings)
 Metal Combat: Falcon's Revenge
 Operation Thunderbolt
 Revolution X 
 Sugoroku Ginga Senki (optional bonus for some boss fights)
 Super Scope 6 (bundled with the hardware)
 T2: The Arcade Game Tin Star X-Zone Yoshi's Safari (required for play)

Other appearances

A Super Scope was painted black and grey and used as a prop in the live-action Super Mario Bros. film. Called the "Devo gun", it is seen being used by King Koopa (Dennis Hopper) in the film's climax. In this film, the Super Scope fires a powerful laser which is capable of devolving anyone whom the laser touches. Images from the live-action Super Mario Bros. film were used to promote the Super Scope's 1993 release in Japan.

The Super Scope appears as an item in Super Smash Bros. Melee for the GameCube, Super Smash Bros. Brawl for the Wii, Super Smash Bros. for Wii U and Nintendo 3DS, and Super Smash Bros. Ultimate'' for the Nintendo Switch. Characters hold it like a bazooka or rifle and fire energy projectiles at opponents either in a continuous rapid-fire salvo or in large "charged" singular shots (one full charge being capable of defeating an opponent even at low damage percentages). However, it has limited ammunition and can be thrown at opponents as an alternate means of combat. It also appears as a trophy in the former 3 games.

In 1993, in a Congressional hearing on violence in video games, Senator Joe Lieberman said that he thought the Super Scope looked like an assault weapon.

See also
BatterUP – A baseball bat controller for the Super NES and Sega Genesis.

References

External links 

Super Nintendo Entertainment System accessories
Light guns
Nintendo controllers

de:Zubehör zum Super Nintendo Entertainment System#Super Scope